The following lists events that happened in 1917 in Iceland.

Incumbents
Prime Minister – Jón Magnússon (from 4 January)

Events

4 January – First cabinet of Jón Magnússon
1917 Úrvalsdeild

Births
21 January – Jón úr Vör, poet (d. 2000).

20 February – Louisa Matthíasdóttir, painter (d. 2000)

17 December – Ellert Sölvason, football player (d. 2002).

Deaths

Rögnvaldur Ólafsson, architect (b. 1874).

References

 
1910s in Iceland
Iceland
Iceland
Years of the 20th century in Iceland